This is a list of presidents of Latvia by age. The first table charts the age of each president of Latvia at the beginning of the presidency, upon leaving office, and at the time of death.

The five oldest presidents, arranged by lifespan:

Presidential age-related data

Notes

Sources
 Former Presidents of Latvia. Website of the President of Latvia.
 President of Latvia Egils Levits. Website of the President of Latvia.

Latvia, Presidents
Presidents
 List